A high priestess is a female high priest.

High Priestess may also refer to:

 High Priestess (album), an album by Kobra and the Lotus
 High Priestess (TV series), an Indian TV series
 The High Priestess, Tarot card

See also 

 High priest (disambiguation)